Mojón Grande is a village and municipality in Misiones Province in north-eastern Argentina. It lies at a latitude of 27 ° 42 'South and a longitude of 55 ° 09' West.

References

Populated places in Misiones Province